Constanta Airline is a Ukrainian charter airline headquartered in Zaporizhzhia and based at Zaporizhzhia International Airport.

History 
Constanta was founded as a private company in 1998 in Zaporizhzhia to operate both passenger and cargo operations. Since 2019, it is registered to operate on behalf of the United Nations.

Fleet 
Constanta Airline operates the following types of aircraft:
Antonov An-26  
Antonov An-28

Accidents  
On 22 April 2022, an Antonov An-26 struck powerlines and crashed near Mykhailivka after it had just departed from Zaporizhzhia Airport. One crew member was killed and two were wounded.

References

External links

Airlines of Ukraine
Airlines established in 1994
Companies based in Zaporizhzhia
Ukrainian companies established in 1994